Twin Lakes Bog State Natural Area is a Wisconsin Department of Natural Resources-designated State Natural Area featuring an intact tamarack (Larix laricina) swamp lying in a depression between two kettle lakes (North Twin Lake and South Twin Lake). The understory of the swamp has an open aspect to it, and is dominated by the ericaceous shrubs Labrador tea (Rhododendron groenlandicum), bog laurel (Kalmia polifolia), and leatherleaf (Chamaedaphne calyculata). Other common plant species found here include: wooly-fruit Sedge (Carex lasiocarpa), twinflower (Linnaea borealis), cinnamon fern (Osmundastrum cinnamomeum), sundews (Drosera rotundifolia) and (Drosera intermedia), and the notably abundant pink ladyslipper (Cypripedium acaule). Three small bog lakes (0.4-1.0 acres), surrounded by quaking bog mats, are found in the interior of the swamp. Uplands surrounding the swamp are forested with second-growth hardwoods dominated by sugar maple (Acer saccharum) and red oak (Quercus rubra). In 1989, the US Forest Service designated Twin Lakes Bog as a Research Natural Area.

Location and access 
Access is via Forest Road 1504, which runs along the western edge of the area.

References

External links 
Twin Lakes Bog Research Natural Area
Twin Lakes Bog State Natural Area
Google Map of Twin Lakes Bog State Natural Area

Protected areas established in 1996
Protected areas of Taylor County, Wisconsin
State Natural Areas of Wisconsin
Bogs of Wisconsin
Landforms of Taylor County, Wisconsin
1996 establishments in Wisconsin